Yoreh De'ah is a section of Rabbi Jacob ben Asher's compilation of halakha (Jewish law), Arba'ah Turim around 1300. This section treats all aspects of Jewish law not pertinent to the Hebrew calendar, finance, torts, marriage, divorce, or sexual conduct. (Nevertheless there exists occasional overlap into the excluded areas). Yoreh De'ah is therefore the most diversified area of Jewish law. Later, Rabbi Yosef Karo modeled the framework of his own compilation of practical Jewish law, the Shulchan Aruch, after the Arba'ah Turim. Many later commentators used this framework, as well. Thus, Yoreh De'ah in common usage may refer to an area of halakha, non-specific to Rabbi Jacob ben Asher's compilation.

Topics include, but are not limited to: 

 Permitted and forbidden foods,
 Circumcision,
 Gentiles,
 Foreign worship,
 Prohibition against charging interest,
 Oaths,
 Converts,
 Honoring parents,
 Honoring scholars and the elderly,
 Charity,
 Torah study,
 Torah scrolls,
 Mezuzah scrolls,
 Sending away the mother bird to take the young,
 Eating new grain,
 Forbidden mixtures (such as shatnez).
 Redeeming the firstborn,
 Excommunication,
 Visiting the sick,
 Mourning,
 Priestly tithes,
 Prohibition against tattooing.

See also

613 mitzvot
The other three sections of Arba'ah Turim and other works borrowing its organizational scheme are: 
Orach Chayim
Choshen Mishpat
Even HaEzer

Rabbinic legal texts and responsa
Hebrew-language religious books
Hebrew words and phrases in Jewish law